The Laois Feile is a competition held every year in Laois. The winner every year gets to go to the Feile. The hurling competition sends the winner to the feile na ngael, and the football competition sends the winner to the Feile Peil na nOg.

2011, 2012, and 2013
Portlaoise won both county feiles, in football and hurling, defeating Naomh Eamonn in hurling and Mountmellick/Ballyfin in football. They followed this up the following year winning the hurling feile final and winning division 2 of the national tournament.

In 2013, St Pauls won their first county feile after defeating Ballylinan/Glenmore in a very one sided football final. They are now the first team to represent laois in division 1 of the feile outside of Laois. Camross won the hurling feile beating Na Fianna by 3-5 to 2-5.

Hurling competitions in Leinster
Gaelic football competitions in Leinster
Laois GAA